SponsorBlock is a free and open-source browser extension designed to skip (block) sponsorship segments in YouTube videos. The extension relies on a user-submitted database to identify sponsorships in videos. Extension users can submit segments in videos and vote on segments others have submitted. The extension is a recommended extension on Firefox's add-on store. , the extension has 271,343 users on Firefox and over 900,000 users on Google Chrome. SponsorBlock segment retrieval API observes 20-anonymity.

History 
Initially, SponsorBlock could only be used to submit and skip sponsorship segments, but support for multiple segment categories (such as self-promotion or intermission segments) was added in June 2020. A revision in January 2022 added support for marking full video sponsorships.

Usage
Users of the extension can submit timestamps for segments in videos and choose a category for them. Those segments are then automatically skipped when the video is playing. When a segment is skipped, a small pop-up appears for a few seconds to allow the user to vote on the segment or to "unskip" it. The extension tracks per-user statistics about the number of segments submitted and skipped, and sums up the amount of time saved since its installation.

Reception
The extension was featured on Mozilla's Extension Spotlight on July 21, 2020. The extension is a recommended extension on Firefox and, is the highest-rated recommended extension listed.

Notes

References

External links
 

2019 software
Free Firefox WebExtensions
Google Chrome extensions
Ad blocking software
Advertising-free media
Free and open-source software
YouTube